Villores is a municipality located in the province of Castelló, Valencian Country.

Municipalities in the Province of Castellón
Ports (comarca)